Zardan may refer to:
 Zardan, Sistan and Baluchestan
 Zardan, Zirkuh, South Khorasan Province
 Zardan, Yazd